Lobengula Khumalo (c. 1845 – presumed January 1894) was the second and last official king of the Northern Ndebele people (historically called Matabele in English). Both names in the Ndebele language mean "the men of the long shields", a reference to the Ndebele warriors' use of the Nguni shield.

Background 
The Matabele were descendants of a faction of the Zulu people who fled north during the reign of Shaka following the mfecane ("the crushing") or difaqane ("the scattering"). Shaka's general, Mzilikazi led his followers away from Zulu territory after a falling-out. In the late 1830s, they settled in what is now called Matabeleland in western Zimbabwe, but they claimed sovereignty over a much wider area.

Members of the tribe had a privileged position against outsiders whose lives were subject to the will of the king. In return for their privileges, however, the Ndebele people both men and women had to submit to a strict discipline and status within the hierarchy. That set out their duties and responsibilities to the rest of society. Infringements of any social responsibility were punished with death, subject to the king's seldom-awarded reprieve. This tight discipline and loyalty were the secret of the Ndebele's success in dominating their neighbours.

Birthright 
After the death of Mzilikazi, the first king of the Ndebele nation, in 1868, the izinduna, or chiefs, offered the crown to Lobengula, one of Mzilikazi's sons from an inferior wife. Several impis (regiments) led by Chief Mbiko Masuku disputed Lobengula's ascent, and the question was ultimately decided by the arbitration of the assegai, with Lobengula and his impis crushing the rebels. Lobengula's courage in the battle led to his unanimous selection as king.

Coronation 
The coronation of Lobengula took place at Mhlahlandlela, one of the principal military towns. The Ndebele nation assembled in the form of a large semicircle, performed a war dance, and declared their willingness to fight and die for Lobengula. A great number of cattle were slaughtered, and the choicest meats were offered to Mlimo, the Ndebele spiritual leader, and to the dead Mzilikazi. Great quantities of millet beer were also consumed.

About 10,000 Matabele warriors in full war costume attended the crowning of Lobengula. Their costumes consisted of a headdress and short cape made of black ostrich feathers, a kilt made of leopard or other skins and ornamented with the tails of white cattle. Around their arms they wore similar tails and around their ankles they wore rings of brass and other metals. Their weapons consisted of one or more long spears for throwing and a short stabbing-spear or assegai (also the principal weapon of the Zulu people). For defence, they carried large oval shields of ox-hide, either black, white, red, or speckled according to the impi (regiment) they belonged to.

The Ndebele maintained their position due to the greater size and tight discipline in the army, to which every able-bodied man in the tribe owed service. "The Ndebele army, consisting of 15,000 men in 40 regiments [was] based around Lobengula's capital of Bulawayo."

Rule 
In 1870 Lobengula granted Sir John Swinburne's London and Limpopo Mining Company the right to search for gold and other minerals on a tract of land in the extreme southwest of Matabeleland along the Tati River between the Shashe and Ramaquabane rivers, in what became known as the Tati Concession.  However, it was not until about 1890 that any significant mining in the area commenced.

Lobengula had been tolerant of the white hunters who came to Matabeleland; he would even go so far as to punish those of his tribe who threatened the whites. However, when a British team (Francis Thompson, Charles Rudd and Rochfort Maguire) came in 1888 to try to persuade him to grant them the right to dig for minerals in additional parts of his territory, he was wary about entering into negotiations. Lobengula gave his agreement only when his friend, Leander Starr Jameson, a qualified medical doctor who had once treated Lobengula for gout, proposed to secure money and weaponry for the Matabele in addition to a pledge that any people who came to dig would be considered as living in his kingdom. As part of this agreement, and at the insistence of the British, neither the Boers nor the Portuguese would be permitted to settle or gain concessions in Matabeleland. Although, Lobengula was illiterate and was not aware of how damaging this contract was to his country, only found out the real terms of the contract he signed as his subjects found out. After going to friendly English missionaries to confirm this rumor, Lobengula sent two emissaries to the British queen,Victoria, but this proved futile. They were delayed by Alfred Beit's associates at the port. As a last resort, Lobengula formally protested the contract to the queen on 23 April 1889. As a response from the queen's advisor, Lobengula was told it was "impossible for them to exclude white men". Lobengula informed Queen Victoria he and his Indunas would recognize the contract as they believe he was tricked. The 25-year Rudd Concession was signed by Lobengula on 30 October 1888.

Matabele War 
The First Matabele War began in October 1893, and the British South Africa Company's overwhelming military force led to devastating losses for the Ndebele warriors, notably at the Battle of the Shangani. As early as December 1893, it was reported that Lobengula had been very sick, but his death sometime in early 1894 was kept a secret for many months, and the cause of his death remains uncertain. By October 1897, the white colonists had successfully settled in much of the territory known later as Rhodesia, and Matabeleland was no more.

Personal life 
He had well over 20 wives, possibly many more; among them were Xwalile, daughter of king Mzila of the Gaza Empire, and Lozikeyi.

See also 
 Shangani Patrol
 Pioneer Column

References

Citations

Sources

External links 
 Texts of the Moffat Treaty and Rudd Concession, signed by Lobengula, which gave Britain and the British South Africa Company rights over his land
 History of Lobengula: Last King of the Matebele
Lobengula's Youngest Daughter

1845 births
1894 deaths
19th-century monarchs in Africa
History of Zimbabwe
People of the First Matabele War
Zulu people